Christer Johnsgård (born 17 February 1987) is a Norwegian footballer who plays as a striker for Tromsdalen.

Johnsgård was born in Silsand. After one season in Tromsø IL he joined Tromsdalen UIL ahead of the 2017 season. Later that same season he moved on to fourth-tier club FK Senja.

He has also had a career in television, presenting the children's show Kråkeklubben on NRK Super.

Career statistics

References

1987 births
Living people
People from Lenvik
Norwegian footballers
Association football forwards
Tromsdalen UIL players
Tromsø IL players
Norwegian First Division players
Norwegian Second Division players
Norwegian Third Division players
Eliteserien players
Norwegian television presenters
NRK people
Norwegian children's television presenters
People from Senja
FK Senja players
Sportspeople from Troms og Finnmark